Quebec City is the capital of the Canadian province of Quebec.

Quebec City or City of Quebec may also refer to:

Places
 Urban agglomeration of Quebec City
 Communauté métropolitaine de Québec, the Metropolitan Community of Quebec City
 Communauté urbaine de Québec (CUQ), the Quebec City Urban Community (Metro Quebec City)
 Old Quebec, the historic district of Quebec City; the walled city of Quebec

Other uses
 HMCS Ville de Quebec (aka HMCS Quebec City), a Royal Canadian Navy ship name

See also
 Name of Quebec City
 List of municipalities in Quebec
 Ville de Québec (disambiguation)
 Quebec (disambiguation)